Lawrence County School District is a public school district headquartered in Walnut Ridge, Arkansas and serving the communities of Lawrence County. Lawrence County School District employs over more than 175 faculty and staff to provide educational programs for students ranging from prekindergarten through twelfth grade and enrolls more than 1,100 students.

It serves most of Walnut Ridge, including the former College City, Black Rock, and Alicia.

All schools in the district are accredited by AdvancED (formerly the North Central Association of Colleges and Schools).

History
The district was formed in 2006 by the merger of the Black Rock School District and the Walnut Ridge School District; the two districts voluntarily agreed to merge. The merger took effect on July 1, 2006.

Schools
Currently operating:
 Walnut Ridge High School : Grades 7–12
 Walnut Ridge Elementary School : Grades PK–6

Former:
 Black Rock High School : Grades 7–12
 Black Rock Elementary School : Grades PK–6
Circa 2007 the Black Rock schools together had 340 students. By 2013 this number fell to 254. In 2013 the district closed the Black Rock schools to avoid financial difficulties.

References

External links 

 

School districts in Arkansas
Education in Lawrence County, Arkansas
2006 establishments in Arkansas
School districts established in 2006